Brian Tristan (born March 27, 1959), better known by his stage name Kid Congo Powers, is an American rock guitarist, singer, and actor best known as a member of The Gun Club, the Cramps and Nick Cave and the Bad Seeds. He has also played with the Divine Horsemen, the Angels of Light, Die Haut, and Knoxville Girls.

As of January 2015, Powers' primary musical project is the band The Pink Monkey Birds.

Early life
Born in La Puente, California, Powers is a second generation Mexican American. His earliest childhood influences were the Southern California Chicano rock band Thee Midniters. In 1976, he was president of The Ramones fan club, then ran a fanzine for The Screamers.

Music

1979–1987: The Gun Club and The Cramps
After traveling to London and New York City he returned to L.A. and in 1979 met Jeffrey Lee Pierce.  Pierce taught him to play guitar using open tuning, and they formed The Creeping Ritual, which became The Gun Club. Powers left that group before their recording debut, instead joining New York-based band The Cramps in December 1980.

Powers rejoined the Gun Club briefly in 1983, touring with Pierce's band in Australia the following year, and then again between 1985 and 1988.

1986–1996: Nick Cave and The Bad Seeds, and The Gun Club
Powers joined Nick Cave and the Bad Seeds in Berlin, Germany, September 1986 for several albums and corresponding tours. Powers recorded the Tender Prey and The Good Son albums with Cave and his band, and he said in early 2015 that he "loved" the "primaeval element of rock'n'roll" that they had a firm grasp of. During April 1990, it was amicably decided with Nick Cave that he leave The Bad Seeds and concentrate on The Gun Club, which he had reconvened with Jeffery Lee Pierce during downtime in 1989.

1997–2009: The Pink Monkey Birds and Dracula Boots
For his next project, The Pink Monkey Birds, Powers initially collaborated with New York City guitarist Jack Martin, who he has also collaborated with for the Congo Norvell and Knoxville Girls projects. Then, in 2009, Powers recruited Kiki Solis on bass, Ron Miller on drums, and Jesse Roberts on guitar and keyboards. The band moved to In The Red Records and released the much acclaimed debut studio album, Dracula Boots, which was called a "return to form."

Dracula Boots was coproduced by Jason Ward and recorded in a former high school gymnasium in Harveyville, Kansas, which is now an artists' retreat called "The Harveyville Project." Dracula Boots consists of numerous genres, including southern soul, 60s Chicano rock, and psychedelic imagery. British magazine N.M.E. wrote: "In short, on Dracula Boots Kid Congo Powers has once again found the juicy jugular of soul-fired, funked-up rock'n'roll. You'd be foolish not to take a bite."

2010–present: Gorilla Rose
In 2011, Kid Congo and The Pink Monkey Birds released their second album, Gorilla Rose, which was also on the In The Red Records label. Eamon Carr of The Dublin Evening Herald said of Gorilla Rose, "Having a working band is paying off. Gorilla Rose elevates seedy go-go weirdness to the level of high art."

Powers returned to Australia for the first time in 25 years—when he toured with Cave's Bad Seeds project—at the end of January 2015. The band played at Melbourne's "Summersalt Festival" and the Sydney Festival. In a promotional interview for the Australian shows, Powers spoke in regard to his new band:

I think the Pink Monkey Birds conjures up all the best aspects of primal rock'n'roll ... Lyrically, I'm speaking in images, and from a very skewed viewpoint, whatever the subject may be. I still have the passion and the incentive to make music that's different, but still within the confines of a punk rock language people will know and understand.

The Pink Monkey Birds, whose name Kid credits to inspiration from David Bowie, has been an evolving unit since their earliest albums, and as of 2016 the touring members are bassist Kiki Solis, drummer Ron Miller, and guitarist Mark Cisneros.

Kid Congo Powers was profiled by Vogue in late April 2016 while promoting his band's fourth album. In the interview, he was noted for his iconic sense of punk style and he mentions the aesthetic importance of tying the look of the band to match the music.

For me, the whole art of being a band—and I do think it's an art—is to create a whole world, a whole language, that is every aspect. The Gun Club, we kind of made it up as we went along, but what I learned from The Cramps and Nick Cave & the Bad Seeds is that they created a whole uncompromising world, and it's all kind of sprung out of that. You want to communicate with people, and I think through all aesthetics—artwork, the look, and music—you get to keep your world, and you get to let people enter your world and live in your world with you.

Personal life
Kid Congo Powers is openly gay and is married. During the 1980s, he was involved with the ACT UP advocacy group.

Selected discography
1981 The Cramps – Psychedelic Jungle
1983 The Cramps – Smell of Female
1984 The Gun Club – The Las Vegas Story
1987 The Gun Club – Mother Juno
1990 The Gun Club – Pastoral Hide and Seek
1991 The Gun Club – Divinity EP
1985 The Fur Bible EP
1988 Nick Cave and the Bad Seeds – Tender Prey
1990 Nick Cave and the Bad Seeds – The Good Son
1988 Barry Adamson – Moss Side Story
1994 Congo Norvell – Music to Remember Him By
1998 Mark Eitzel – Caught in a Trap and I Can't Back Out 'Cause I Love You Too Much, Baby
2005 Kid Congo Powers – Solo Cholo
2006 Kid Congo and the Pink Monkey Birds – Philosophy and Underwear
2006 Madrugada – Live at Oslo Spektrum [DVD]
2009 Kid Congo and The Pink Monkey Birds – Dracula Boots
2011 Kid Congo and The Pink Monkey Birds – Gorilla Rose
2013 Kid Congo and The Pink Monkey Birds – Haunted Head
2016 Kid Congo and The Pink Monkey Birds – La Araña Es La Vida
2021 Kid Congo and The Pink Monkey Birds – Swing From The Sean DeLear

Selected filmography 
1987 Wings of Desire 
1999 Modern Young Man (film short)
2000 Once and Future Queen
2000 Hair Burners
2017 Scumbag
2022 The Resort (TV Series)

References

External links
Official website
New York Night Train profile page
2013 Rocker Magazine interview – video and print

American indie rock musicians
American blues guitarists
American male guitarists
American rock guitarists
Punk blues musicians
The Cramps members
1961 births
Living people
American musicians of Mexican descent
American LGBT musicians
LGBT people from California
LGBT Hispanic and Latino American people
Musicians from Los Angeles County, California
People from La Puente, California
20th-century American musicians
21st-century American musicians
Nick Cave and the Bad Seeds members
Guitarists from California
20th-century American guitarists
21st-century American guitarists
Hispanic and Latino American musicians
In the Red artists
Mute Records artists
The Gun Club members